Rosa Seamount is a submarine mountain (seamount) west of the Baja California.

References

Natural history of Baja California
Seamounts of the Pacific Ocean